William Shields Goodwin (May 2, 1866 – August 9, 1937) was a United States Representative from Arkansas.

Born in Warren, Arkansas, Goodwin attended the public schools, the Farmers' Academy near Duluth, Georgia, Cooledge's Preparatory School, Moore's College, Atlanta, Georgia, and the Universities of Arkansas and Mississippi.
He studied law.
He was admitted to the bar in 1894 and commenced practice in Warren, Arkansas.
He served as member of the Arkansas House of Representatives in 1895, and in the Arkansas Senate from 1905 to 1909.
He served as member of the board of trustees of the University of Arkansas at Fayetteville 1907 to 1911.

Goodwin was elected as a Democrat to the Sixty-second and to the four succeeding Congresses (March 4, 1911 – March 3, 1921).
He was an unsuccessful candidate for renomination in 1920.
Reengaged in the practice of law in Warren, Arkansas, until his death there August 9, 1937.
He was interred in Oak Lawn Cemetery.

References

1866 births
1937 deaths
Democratic Party members of the Arkansas House of Representatives
Democratic Party Arkansas state senators
Democratic Party members of the United States House of Representatives from Arkansas